Musa peekelii is a species of wild banana (genus Musa), native to eastern New Guinea and the Bismarck Archipelago. It is placed in section Callimusa (now including the former section Australimusa), members of which have a diploid chromosome number of 2n = 20. The ripe bananas are red with bright yellow flesh. It is one of the possible parents of the cultivated Fe'i bananas.

The subspecies M. peekelii subsp. angustigemma has been treated as a separate species, M. angustigemma.

References

peekelii
Plants described in 1913
Flora of Papua New Guinea
Flora of the Bismarck Archipelago